Minkler is a census-designated place in eastern Fresno County, California. It has a population of 1,003 people. The town is named for Charles O. Minkler, a local farmer. The current mayor of Minkler is Wyatt Barnett.

Minkler made headlines in February 2010 for a police shootout that took the lives of Fresno County Sheriff's Deputy Joel Whalenmair and Reedley Police Department officer Javier Bejar, as well as the shooter, Rick Liles.

Demographics
At the 2010 census Minkler had a population of 1,003. The racial makeup of Minkler was 818 (81.6%) White, 4 (0.4%) African American, 20 (2.0%) Native American, 23 (2.3%) Asian, 0 (0.0%) Pacific Islander, 108 (10.8%) from other races, and 30 (3.0%) from two or more races. Hispanic or Latino of any race were 302 people (30.1%).

The whole population lived in households, no one lived in non-institutionalized group quarters and no one was institutionalized.

There were 383 households, 103 (26.9%) had children under the age of 18 living in them, 225 (58.7%) were opposite-sex married couples living together, 22 (5.7%) had a female householder with no husband present, 18 (4.7%) had a male householder with no wife present.  There were 19 (5.0%) unmarried opposite-sex partnerships, and 4 (1.0%) same-sex married couples or partnerships. 96 households (25.1%) were one person and 44 (11.5%) had someone living alone who was 65 or older. The average household size was 2.62.  There were 265 families (69.2% of households); the average family size was 3.09.

The age distribution was 205 people (20.4%) under the age of 18, 81 people (8.1%) aged 18 to 24, 180 people (17.9%) aged 25 to 44, 329 people (32.8%) aged 45 to 64, and 208 people (20.7%) who were 65 or older.  The median age was 47.6 years. For every 100 females, there were 95.5 males.  For every 100 females age 18 and over, there were 97.5 males.

There were 427 housing units at an average density of ,of which 383 were occupied, 277 (72.3%) by the owners and 106 (27.7%) by renters.  The homeowner vacancy rate was 3.1%; the rental vacancy rate was 14.4%.  692 people (69.0% of the population) lived in owner-occupied housing units and 311 people (31.0%) lived in rental housing units.

References

Census-designated places in Fresno County, California
Census-designated places in California